Mark McGuinn (born August 19, 1968) is an American country music artist. He made his debut in 2001 with the single "Mrs. Steven Rudy", a Top 10 hit on the U.S. Billboard Hot Country Singles & Tracks charts. It was the first of three singles from his first album Mark McGuinn, which was released in 2001 on the independent VFR Records label. The label was closed in 2002, and McGuinn did not a record another album until One Man's Crazy in 2006, released on Blue Flamingo Records. He has not recorded an album since then.

Biography
McGuinn was born in Greensboro, North Carolina. His musical background includes playing trumpet in a jazz band. McGuinn later aspired to become a professional soccer player. After a knee injury, he decided to move to Nashville, Tennessee, in 1994 to become a songwriter instead.

Musical career
By 2001, McGuinn was signed to VFR Records, a newly formed independent record label, which released his first album, Mark McGuinn, in May that year. Initially, the label had planned to release "That's a Plan" as the album's first single. After a disc jockey at KPLX in Dallas, Texas, began playing "Mrs. Steven Rudy", another track from the album, other nearby stations soon followed suit. Due to the reaction the song was receiving in this market, the label released it as McGuinn's first single, with "That's a Plan" on the B-side.

Upon the release of "Mrs. Steven Rudy", McGuinn was considered a "dark horse" on the country music scene, due in part to his jazz background and beatnik image, which were considered outside the norms of country radio. "Mrs. Steven Rudy" was a top ten hit on the Billboard country music charts, and the highest-selling single on the country singles sales charts for five consecutive weeks. His album entered the Top Country Albums chart at number 18, setting a new record for the highest entry on that chart for the first release from an independent label. "That's a Plan" was eventually released as the second single, followed by "She Doesn't Dance". These songs peaked at numbers 25 and 29, respectively, on the country charts.

Rick Cohoon of Allmusic rated the album four stars out of five, saying that it "combines an entertaining musical arrangement with solid songwriting."

After first album
On the day of the September 11, 2001, attacks, McGuinn wrote and recorded a tribute song entitled "More Beautiful Today". He insisted that the song not be released to radio (although it did receive enough airplay to enter the country charts), and made it available only as a download on his website.

McGuinn also wrote a song entitled "Unusually Unusual", which was recorded by the country band Lonestar on their 2001 album I'm Already There. This song was released in late 2002 as a single, reaching number 12 on the country charts. Later that year, VFR declared bankruptcy, leaving McGuinn without a record deal. He then took a break to begin a family.

McGuinn returned to the studio in 2005 to record his second album, One Man's Crazy. It was released that year on Blue Flamingo Records, an independent label started by McGuinn and one of his co-writing partners, Jim Foster. "More Beautiful Today" was also reprised for this album. In 2008, George Jones released the single "You and Me and Time", which McGuinn co-wrote.

Mark McGuinn (2001)

Track listing
 "Mrs. Steven Rudy" (Mark McGuinn, Shane Decker) – 3:29
 "Heaven Must Be Missin' You" (McGuinn, Trey Matthews) – 3:41
 "No Way" (McGuinn, Matthews) – 2:29
 "That's a Plan" (Bobby Boyd, David Leone) – 3:26
 "If the World Was Mine" (McGuinn, Decker) – 4:29
 "One of Their Own" (McGuinn, Boyd) – 3:52
 "She Doesn't Dance" (McGuinn, Don Pfrimmer, Decker) – 4:12
 "Silver Platter" (McGuinn, Matthews) – 3:58
 "All About the Ride" (McGuinn, Boyd, Billy Davidson) – 3:20
 "Love Don't Float" (McGuinn, Jim Foster) – 3:38
 "Busy Signal" (McGuinn, Matthews) – 4:28
 "Done It Right" (McGuinn, Pfrimmer, Decker) – 3:04

Personnel
Steve Bryant – bass guitar
J. T. Corenflos – electric guitar
Gary DiBenedetto – steel guitar
Dan Dugmore – steel guitar
Glen Duncan – fiddle
Gary Hogue – steel guitar
Don Kerce – bass guitar
Wayne Killius – drums, drum loops, percussion
Troy Lancaster – electric guitar
Mark McGuinn – lead vocals, background vocals
Dennis McCracken – background vocals
Curt Ryle – acoustic guitar, background vocals
Scott Sanders – steel guitar
Wanda Vick – banjo, Dobro, fiddle, mandolin
Dennis Wage – piano, keyboards

Chart positions

One Man's Crazy (2006)

Track listing
 "One Man's Crazy" (Mark McGuinn, Don Pfrimmer) – 4:00
 "115lbs" (M. McGuinn, Jim Foster) – 3:48
 "Deep" (M. McGuinn, Pfrimmer) – 3:05
 "Bring 'Em Back" (M. McGuinn, S. McGuinn) – 4:16
 "Turtle" (M. McGuinn, Foster) – 3:31
 "Better a Painful Ending" (M. McGuinn, Sharyn Lane) – 4:26
duet with Georgette Jones
 "Trampoline" (M. McGuinn, John Reynolds) – 4:09
 "Centreville" (M. McGuinn, Pfrimmer, Dennis McCraken) – 3:25
 "Mona Lisa" (M. McGuinn, Trey Matthews) – 3:27
 "Everest" (M. McGuinn, Pfrimmer) – 3:31
 "Y" (M. McGuinn, Reynolds) – 2:47
 "Wide Open" (M. McGuinn, Kevin Fisher) – 4:07
 "Big Girl" (M. McGuinn) – 2:53
 "More Beautiful Today" (M. McGuinn, Reynolds, Bill Davidson) – 5:01

Personnel
Mark McGuinn – lead vocals, background vocals, acoustic guitar, electric guitar, Dobro, strings, mandolin, Wurlitzer electric piano, trumpet
Jim Brown – piano, keyboards
Bill Davidson – electric guitar, banjo
Georgette Jones – background vocals ("Wide Open")
Don Kerce – bass guitar, drum programming, cello, percussion
Wayne Killius – drums, drum loops
Jim Kimball – acoustic guitar
Dennis McCracken – background vocals ("Wide Open")
Russ Pahl – Dobro, electric guitar, steel guitar
Danny Parks – electric guitar, slide guitar, 12-string guitar, baritone guitar, archtop guitar
Brian Pruitt – drums, drum loops
Wanda Vick – fiddle

Singles

Music videos

References

External links
MarkMcGuinn.com

1968 births
American country pianists
American male pianists
American country singer-songwriters
Living people
Musicians from Greensboro, North Carolina
Singer-songwriters from North Carolina
20th-century American pianists
Country musicians from North Carolina
21st-century American pianists
20th-century American male musicians
21st-century American male musicians
American male singer-songwriters
Grimsley High School alumni